Mein Hari Piya is a Pakistani television family soap series aired on ARY Digital from 4 October 2021 to 20 January 2022. It is produced by Fahad Mustafa and Ali Kazmi under Big Bang Entertainment. It stars Sami Khan, Sumbul Iqbal and Hira Mani in lead roles.

Cast
Sami Khan as Fawad Durrani 
Sumbul Iqbal as Farwa Fawad as Fawad second wife
Hira Mani as Sara Fawad as Fawad First Wife
Marina Khan as Fawad's mother Nafeesa Durrani 
Hassan Niazi as Waqar as Maira husband and Hina brother
Maira Khan as Maria as Waqar wife and Fawad and Saud sister and Hina sister in law 
Ayaz Samoo as Salman as Farwa brother
Hamza Sohail as Saud Durrani younger brother of Fawad and Maira
Noshaba Javed Farwa and Salman mother and Saad grandmother 
Birjees Farooqui as Bilal's mother
Nida Khan as Hina Saud Wife and Waqar younger sister
Shaista Jabeen as Hina and Waqar mother and Maira mother in law
Hina Rizvi as Javeria as Sara eldest sister lives between Pakistan and USA
Nighat Zafar as Mina Housemaid in Durrani household 
Yaseen Ali
Rubi Saleem 
Asfar Khan

References

ARY Digital original programming
2021 Pakistani television series debuts
2022 Pakistani television series endings